The Very Best of Simply Red is a two-CD compilation album by Simply Red, originally released in 2003 in Japan.

Track listing

Hold Me (Disc 1)
 "Stars"
 "Holding Back the Years" [12" Extended Version]
 "It's Only Love"
 "If You Don't Know Me by Now"
 "You've Got It"
 "For Your Babies"
 "Never Never Love"
 "We're in This Together"
 "Angel" (featuring Wyclef Jean and Lauryn Hill)
 "Night Nurse" (with Sly & Robbie)
 "Say You Love Me"
 "The Air That I Breathe"
 "Ev'ry Time We Say Goodbye"
 "Mellow My Mind"
 "Someday in My Life"
 "Heaven"
 "Love for Sale"
 "Lady Godiva's Room"
 "Granma's Hands" [Live at the Montreux Jazz Festival: 8 July 1992]

Thrill Me (Disc 2)
 "Money's Too Tight (to Mention)"
 "Fairground"
 "Something Got Me Started"
 "A New Flame"
 "The Right Thing" [12" Extended Version]
 "Infidelity"
 "I Won't Feel Bad"
 "Come to My Aid" [12" Extended Version]
 "Your Mirror"
 "Thrill Me"
 "Remembering the First Time"
 "To Be Free"
 "Ghetto Girl"
 "Ain't That a Lot of Love"
 "Jericho"
 "Thank You"
 "Come on in My Kitchen" [1999 Version]
 "I Know You Got Soul" [Live in Australia: August 1989]

Charts

Weekly charts

Year-end charts

Certifications

References

Simply Red albums
2003 greatest hits albums